Mieczysław Tarka (11 December 1919 – 7 February 1976) was a Polish footballer. He played in two matches for the Poland national football team from 1948 to 1949.

References

External links
 

1919 births
1976 deaths
Polish footballers
Poland international footballers
Place of birth missing
Association footballers not categorized by position